Lampadomancy is a form of divination using a single oil lamp or a torch flame.

As with Lychnoscopy, the diviner reads presages from the movements of the flame. An alternate method is also practiced, consisting of reading the spots of carbon deposited on paper sheets held over the flame.  In yet another method, the diviner uses the lamp as a means of "attracting spirits to the flames", in the hope of consulting them regarding future events. In this method, usually a specially designed lamp is employed, on the belief that grotesque forms will attract the spirits. 

Lychnomancy is a related form of divination with flames of three identical candles arranged in a triangle.

Lampadomancy was a popular method of divination in ancient Egypt, where diviners would perform it at midday in a darkened room illuminated by a single lamp filled with oasis oil.

References

 
 

Divination